The 2016 ISC Liga Nusantara or 2016 Indonesia Soccer Championship C season is the second edition of Liga Nusantara after the Second Division and Third Division merged on 2014 season.  This season is managed by competition committee of Province Association for qualification round and managed by PT. GTS in national round. The competition started in May 2016.

Perseden Denpasar became champion after beating PSN Ngada 2–0 in the final.

Format
Each Provincial Association only given one representative to the national round. 32 teams will perform in the final round, consist of 30 teams of provincial competition winners and two winning teams from play-off of the bottom four teams. 
National round took place in several provinces that have been determined by PT GTS with the following format: 
Preliminary round contains 32 teams divided into eight groups. Two teams from each group will advance to the knockout round.

Teams
Each Provincial Association only given one representative to the national round.

Sumatra Region

Java Region

Kalimantan Region

Sulawesi Region

Bali and Nusa Tenggara Region

Maluku and Papua Region

National Round
National round will take place in Central Java and Special Region of Yogyakarta.

Group stage
32 teams from each provincial association will compete. Matches for the Group stage will be played from 19 to 25 November 2016. All group will play half season round-robin.

Group A 
This group will be held in Jenderal Hoegeng Stadium, Pekalongan and Moh Sarengat Stadium, Batang Regency.

Match 1

Match 2

Match 3

Group B 
This group will be held in Jatidiri Stadium, Semarang and Citarum Stadium, Semarang.

Match 1

Match 2

Match 3

Group C 
This group will be held in Pandanaran Stadium, Ungaran.

Match 1

Match 2

Match 3

Group D 
This group will be held in Gelora Bumi Kartini Stadium, Jepara.

Match 1

Match 2

Match 3

Group E 
This group will be held in Wergu Wetan Stadium, Kudus.

Match 1

Match 2

Match 3

Group F 
This group will be held in Sapta Marga Stadium, Magelang.

Match 1

Match 2

Match 3

Group G 
This group will be held in Sriwedari Stadium, Surakarta.

Match 1

Match 2

Match 3

Group H 
This group will be held in Sultan Agung Stadium, Bantul.

Match 1

Match 2

Match 3

Knockout stage

Round of 16
Matches for the Round of 16 will be played at 28 November 2016.

Quarter-finals
Matches for the quarter-finals will be played at 2 December 2016.

Semi-finals
Matches for Semi-finals will be played at 6 December 2016.

Third Place
Matches for Third Place Play-off will be played at 11 December 2016.

Final
Matches for Final will be played at 11 December 2016.

Champions

See also
 2016 Indonesia Soccer Championship A
 2016 Indonesia Soccer Championship B
 2016 Indonesia Soccer Championship U-21
 2016 Soeratin Cup

References

External links
Indonesia Soccer Championship official site 

 

Liga 3 (Indonesia) seasons
Indonesia
Indonesia
2016 in Indonesian sport